Events from the year 1996 in Russia.

Incumbents
President: Boris Yeltsin
Prime Minister: Viktor Chernomyrdin 
Minister of Defence: Pavel Grachev (until 17 July), Mikhail Kolesnikov (until 17 July), Igor Rodionov

Events

January
9–18 January – Kizlyar-Pervomayskoye hostage crisis

April
16 April – Shatoy ambush

June
16 June – The first round of the 1996 Russian presidential election is held.

July
3 July – The second round of the 1996 Russian presidential election is held.

August
6–20 August – Battle of Grozny (August 1996)
30 August – The Khasavyurt Accord is signed.

November
11 November – Kotlyakovskoya Cemetery bombing

December
24 December – The Bion No.11 spacecraft is launched.

Births 
16 March – Anna Ovcharova, Russian/Swiss figure skater
19 March – Feodosiy Efremenkov, figure skater
2 April – Polina Agafonova, figure skater
12 April – Elizaveta Kulichkova, tennis player
14 April – Tuyana Dashidorzhieva, archer
22 May – Aleksandr Ageyev, footballer

Deaths
27 January – Vsevolod Sanayev, actor (b. 1912)
23 May – Kronid Lyubarsky, human rights activist (b. 1934)
14 June – Alexander Knyazhinsky, cinematographer (b. 1936)
29 June – Dmitri Pokrovsky, musician (b. 1944)
3 November - Paul Tatum, Russian-American businessman (born 1955)

References

 
1990s in Russia
Years of the 20th century in Russia
Russia
Russia
Russia